The JD and VJ family is a series of 3.0-litre, naturally-aspirated V10 Formula One engines, designed by Cosworth in partnership with Ford; used between  and . The customer engines were used by Sauber, Stewart, Minardi, and Tyrrell.

Overview

The JD, VJ and VJM V10
In order to produce a higher power at higher rpm, a completely new  (89mm x 48.1mm) JD 72° V10 was designed for 1996, which produced about 670 bhp at 15,800 rpm, and used by Sauber Formula One team. This engine was further developed into VJ and VJM with the same V-angle, bore and stroke, reaching 720 bhp for racing, 730 bhp for qualifying, at 16,500 rpm. All three of these engines were badged as Ford Zetec-R as well, and used by several teams. In its debut season, the best result was another third place, this time taken by Johnny Herbert at Monaco. This was surpassed one year later by Rubens Barichello's sensational second place, again at Monaco, which was the first points finish for the newly formed Stewart Grand Prix team.

References

Ford engines
Cosworth
V10 engines
Formula One engines